The 2012 Major League Baseball postseason was the playoff tournament of Major League Baseball for the 2012 season. The winners of the League Division Series moved on to the League Championship Series to determine the pennant winners that face each other in the World Series. A new Wild Card Game was introduced as the opening round of the postseason, which features the #4 and #5 seeds of each league, and the winner faced the top seed in the LDS, marking the first expansion of the postseason since 1995.

In the American League, the New York Yankees made their seventeenth postseason appearance of the past eighteen years, the Detroit Tigers returned for the second year in a row, the Oakland Athletics made their first appearance since 2006, the Texas Rangers returned for the third straight time, and the Baltimore Orioles made their first postseason appearance since 1997.

In the National League, the San Francisco Giants and Cincinnati Reds returned for the second time in three years, the St. Louis Cardinals made their second straight appearance, the Washington Nationals made their first postseason appearance since 1981 (when they were originally the Montreal Expos), and the Atlanta Braves returned for the second time in three years.

The postseason began on October 5, 2012, and ended on October 28, 2012, with the Giants sweeping the Tigers in the 2012 World Series. It was the second title in three years for the Giants and their seventh overall.

Playoff seeds
With the addition of the Wild Card, the three division winners all gained a first-round bye. The fourth and fifth seeded teams of each league would play in the Wild Card game to determine the winner who played the top seed in each league.

The following teams qualified for the postseason:

American League
 New York Yankees – AL East champions, 95–67
 Oakland Athletics – AL West champions, 94–68
 Detroit Tigers – AL Central champions, 88–74
 Texas Rangers – 93–69 (5–2 head-to-head record vs. BAL)
 Baltimore Orioles – 93–69 (2–5 head-to-head record vs. TEX)

National League
 Washington Nationals – NL East champions, 98–64
 Cincinnati Reds – NL Central champions, 97–65
 San Francisco Giants – NL West champions, 94–68
 Atlanta Braves – 94–68
 St. Louis Cardinals – 88–74

Playoff bracket

American League Wild Card

(4) Texas Rangers vs. (5) Baltimore Orioles 

The Orioles defeated the Rangers in the inaugural Wild Card game by a 5–1 score to return to the ALDS for the first time since 1997. The Rangers would not return to the postseason again until 2015.

National League Wild Card

(4) Atlanta Braves vs. (5) St. Louis Cardinals 

This was the fourth postseason meeting between the Cardinals and Braves. The Cardinals defeated the Braves 6–3 to advance to the NLDS for the second year in a row. Both teams would meet again in the 2019 NLDS, which the Cardinals won.

American League Division Series

(1) New York Yankees vs. (5) Baltimore Orioles 

This was the first postseason meeting between these two teams since the 1996 ALCS, which the Yankees won in five games. The Yankees once again defeated the Orioles in a tightly-contested series to advance to the ALCS. 

In Baltimore, both teams split the first two games - CC Sabathia helped lead the Yankees to victory in Game 1, while the Orioles struck back in Game 2 to even the series headed to the Bronx. Games 3 and 4 were both long, ugly, extra-inning affairs - in Game 3, the Yankees rallied in the bottom of the ninth to tie the game thanks to a solo home run from Raúl Ibañez, and then did it again in the bottom of the twelfth to win the game and give the Yankees the series lead. Game 4 was another long and ugly extra-inning affair that lasted thirteen innings - the game remained scoreless for six innings after the bottom of the sixth, until Manny Machado helped the Orioles even the series by scoring on an RBI double from J. J. Hardy. The Yankees would ultimately close out the series in Game 5 with a complete game performance from Sabathia. 

The Orioles would make their next postseason appearance in 2014, where they swept the Detroit Tigers in the ALDS before being swept by the Kansas City Royals in the ALCS. This was the last playoff series win by the Yankees until 2017.

(2) Oakland Athletics vs. (3) Detroit Tigers 

This was the third postseason meeting between the Athletics and Tigers. Despite blowing a 2–0 series lead, the Tigers held on in Game 5 thanks to a stellar pitching performance by Justin Verlander, and advanced to the ALCS for the second year in a row. 

Verlander and the Tigers' bullpen secured the first game, while in Game 2 the Tigers prevailed in the bottom of the ninth thanks to a sacrifice fly from Don Kelly. When the series shifted to Oakland, Brett Anderson helped the Athletics shut out the Tigers in Game 3, and then rallied with three runs in the bottom of the ninth inning of Game 4 to even the series. However, Verlander would pitch a complete game shutout in Game 5, 6-0, to close out the series.

This series was an inversion of the 1972 ALCS between both teams. In that ALCS, the Athletics took the first two games at home, and while the Tigers evened the series in Detroit, fell by one run in Game 5. 

The Athletics and Tigers would meet in the ALDS again the next year, which the Tigers also won in five games.

National League Division Series

(1) Washington Nationals vs. (5) St. Louis Cardinals 

This was the first postseason meeting between the Cardinals and Nationals. The Cardinals rallied late in Game 5 to upset the MLB-best Nationals and advance to the NLCS for the second year in a row. 

The Nationals stole Game 1 on the road with a 3-2 victory, while the Cardinals blew out the Nationals in Game 2 to even the series headed to the nation's capital. In Game 3, the Cardinals blew out the Nationals again to take a 2-1 series lead. The Nationals' bullpen helped even the series to force a Game 5. The Nationals held a 7-5 lead in the bottom of the ninth and were one out away from advancing to the NLCS for the first time in 31 years. However, the Nationals' bullpen imploded, as they gave up four unanswered runs as the Cardinals took the lead for good. The Cardinals then closed out the series in the bottom of the ninth to advance.

With the win, the Cardinals became the first fifth-seeded team to knock off a number one seed in the LDS. Both teams would meet again in the 2019 NLCS, which was won by the Nationals in a sweep en route to a World Series title.

(2) Cincinnati Reds vs. (3) San Francisco Giants 

The Giants overcame a 2–0 series deficit to defeat the Reds in five games and advance to the NLCS for the second time in three years. 

The Reds took Game 1 on the road by a 5-2 score to win their first postseason game since 1995. In Game 2, Bronson Arroyo outdueled San Francisco ace Madison Bumgarner as the Reds blew out the Giants by a 9-0 score to take a 2-0 series lead, handing Bumgarner his worst postseason loss ever. When the series moved to Cincinnati, the Giants narrowly prevailed in an extra-inning Game 3 to avoid elimination, then blew out the Reds in Game 4 to tie the series at two games each. Then in Game 5, the Giants jumped out to a 6-0 lead, and fended off a late comeback by the Reds to return to the NLCS.

As of 2022, this is the last postseason appearance outside of the Wild Card round for the Reds.

American League Championship Series

(1) New York Yankees vs. (3) Detroit Tigers 

†: postponed from October 17 due to rain

This was the third postseason meeting between these two teams, with the Tigers winning the previous two meetings in 2006 and 2011. The Tigers swept the Yankees to advance to the World Series for the first time since 2006 (in the process denying a rematch of the 1962 World Series).

The Tigers won Game 1 after 12 innings of play, then proceeded to shut out the Yankees in Game 2 thanks to a stellar pitching performance by Aníbal Sánchez. Justin Verlander helped secure a narrow victory for the Tigers in Game 3, then in Game 4, the Tigers blew out the Yankees to secure the pennant. 

With the win, the Tigers improved their postseason record against the Yankees to 3–0. This was the last time the Yankees were swept in the ALCS until 2022. To date, this is the last time the Tigers won the AL pennant. 

The Tigers returned to the ALCS the next year, but fell to the Boston Red Sox in six games. The Yankees returned to the ALCS in 2017, but they would lose to the Houston Astros in seven games.

National League Championship Series

(3) San Francisco Giants vs. (5) St. Louis Cardinals 

This was the third postseason meeting between the Cardinals and Giants. They had split the previous two meetings, in 1987 (Cardinals victory), and 2002 (Giants victory). The Cardinals took a three games to one series lead at home, but their lead would not hold. The Giants proceeded to blow out the defending World Series champions in the next three games to return to the World Series for the second time in three years. 

The Cardinals stole Game 1 on the road, while Ryan Vogelsong helped the Giants blow out the Cardinals in Game 2 with a solid seven-inning pitching performance. In St. Louis, the Cardinals narrowly prevailed in Game 3, and Adam Wainwright had a solid seven-inning performance in Game 4 as the Cardinals won by a convincing 8-3 score to take a 3-1 series lead. However, the Cardinals failed to maintain the lead. Barry Zito pitched eight shutout innings as the Giants won 5-0 to send the series back to San Francisco. Vogelsong again helped keep the Cardinals offense at bay in Game 6 to force a seventh game. The Giants blew out the Cardinals in Game 7 to clinch the pennant.

With this win, the Giants moved up to 2–1 against the Cardinals in the postseason. The Giants became the first team in MLB history to overcome both an 2-0 and 3–1 series deficit in the LDS and LCS respectively to reach the World Series.

Both teams would meet again in the 2014 NLCS, which the Giants won in five games. The Cardinals returned to the NLCS the next year, and defeated the Los Angeles Dodgers in six games to return to the World Series.

2012 World Series

(AL3) Detroit Tigers vs. (NL3) San Francisco Giants 

This was the Giants' fifth World Series matchup against a team from the American League Central Division. Previously they had faced the White Sox in 1917 (won by the White Sox), the Twins/Senators in 1924 (won by the Senators), and 1933 (won by the Giants), and the Indians in 1954 (won by the Giants). This was the second World Series in which the Tigers faced a team from California. They previously faced the San Diego Padres in the 1984 World Series, who they defeated in five games.

The Tigers were considered as the favorite to win the title even though the Giants had the better record and home-field advantage. Despite having Triple Crown winner Miguel Cabrera, and the top two pitchers in the American League in Justin Verlander and Max Scherzer, the heavily-favored Tigers were shockingly swept by the Giants, who won their second title in three years and seventh overall. The Giants chased Verlander from the mound in a blowout victory in Game 1, then proceeded to shut out the Tigers in games 2 and 3. The Tigers took their first lead of the series in Game 4, but it would not hold, and the Giants won the title in extra innings. This was the third straight World Series win by the National League.

With the win, the Giants moved up to 3–2 against AL Central teams in the World Series. The Giants would return to the World Series in 2014 to face another AL Central team in the Kansas City Royals, who they defeated in seven games.

To date, this is the last appearance by a team from Detroit in the championship round in either one of the four major North American sports leagues. The Tigers failed to return to the World Series the next year, losing to the Boston Red Sox in six games in the 2013 ALCS.

References

External links
 League Baseball Standings & Expanded Standings - 2012

 
Major League Baseball postseason